Parliamentary elections were held in Chile on 1 March 1953. The Agrarian Labor Party emerged as the largest party in the Chamber of Deputies, whilst the Liberal Party won the most seats in the Senate.

Electoral system
The term length for Senators was eight years, with around half of the Senators elected every four years. This election saw 25 of the 45 Senate seats up for election.

Results

Senate

Chamber of Deputies

References

Elections in Chile
Chile
Parliamentary
Chile
Election and referendum articles with incomplete results